Omobolaji Habeeb "Bobby" Adekanye (born 14 February 1999) is a professional footballer who plays as a forward for Go Ahead Eagles. Born in Nigeria, Adekanye represents the Netherlands internationally.

Club career

Barcelona scandal
Adekanye signed to Liverpool from FC Barcelona in 2015 having previously been at AFC Ajax. Adekanye was forced to leave Barcelona when they were found to have broken FIFA's rules on signing underage players. Adekanye was one of six youth players barred from playing again for Barcelona by FIFA. Barcelona were also given a one-year transfer ban and fined £306,000.

Racism scandal
Spartak Moscow were charged by UEFA over alleged racist behaviour by their supporters towards Adekanye during a UEFA Youth League match against Liverpool. Despite being found guilty, in the next match they played Liverpool again had to report Spartak Moscow fans for racist chants towards another of their players, Rhian Brewster.

Lazio
Adekanye moved to Italian club Lazio on 3 July 2019. Adekanye made his debut for Lazio on 19 September 2019 in the UEFA Europa League against CFR Cluj. He made his Serie A debut on 29 September 2019 against Genoa. On 28 November 2019, he played for the first time as starter in Europa League against Cluj.

Loan to Cádiz
On 5 October 2020, Adekanye joined La Liga side Cádiz CF on loan for the 2020–21 season. The deal, however, was called off midway through the season, with Adekanye having made five appearances for the Spanish side.

Loan to ADO Den Haag 
On 28 January 2021, Adekanye moved to Eredivisie club ADO Den Haag on a loan deal until the end of the season.

Loan to Crotone
On 30 January 2022, Adekanye was loaned to Crotone in Serie B until the end of the season.

Go Ahead Eagles
On 21 June 2022, Adekanye joined Go Ahead Eagles on a two-year contract.

International career
Although born in Nigeria, Adekanye has represented the Netherlands at international youth levels having moved there at the age of 4.

Honours
Lazio
Supercoppa Italiana: 2019

References

External links

1999 births
Living people
Sportspeople from Ibadan
Association football forwards
Dutch footballers
Netherlands youth international footballers
Nigerian footballers
Nigerian emigrants to the Netherlands
Naturalised citizens of the Netherlands
S.S. Lazio players
Liverpool F.C. players
Cádiz CF players
ADO Den Haag players
F.C. Crotone players
Go Ahead Eagles players
Serie A players
La Liga players
Eredivisie players
Serie B players
Dutch expatriate footballers
Nigerian expatriate footballers
Nigerian expatriate sportspeople in Spain
Nigerian expatriate sportspeople in England
Nigerian expatriate sportspeople in Italy
Expatriate footballers in Spain
Expatriate footballers in England
Expatriate footballers in Italy